Hanoi Stock Exchange (HNX), formerly the Hanoi Securities Trading Center (Hanoi STC) until 2009, is located in Hanoi, Vietnam, and was launched in March 2005. It handles auctions and trading of stocks and bonds. It was the second securities trading center to open in Vietnam after he Ho Chi Minh City Securities Trading Center.

At the end of 2006, combined market capitalization of both Ho Chi Minh City Securities Trading Center and Hanoi Securities Trading Center was 14 billion USD, or 22.7% the GDP of Vietnam.

Foreign investors are also permitted to invest up to a limit of 49% ownership of companies except banks, where the limit was 30%.

On 18 May 2015, the HNX joined the United Nations Sustainable Stock Exchanges (SSE) initiative as part the SSE's regional dialogue in Bangkok hosted by the Stock Exchange of Thailand.

From 2020, HNX served as Vietnam's bonds exchange while all stock tradings were transferred to HOSE.

See also
Ho Chi Minh City Stock Exchange

References

External links
 Official website

Financial services companies established in 2005
2005 establishments in Vietnam
Economy of Vietnam
Economy of Hanoi
 
Stock exchanges in Vietnam